EJC may refer to:

 Eden Junior College, in Patna, Bihar, India
 Église de Jésus-Christ, an independent Christian church in Congo
 Electronic Journal of Combinatorics, an academic journal
 European Jewish Congress
 European Journal of Cancer, a medical journal
 European Journalism Centre, a journalism institute based in the Netherlands
 European Judo Championships
 European Juggling Convention
 European Junior Championships (disambiguation)
 European Junior Cup, a motorcycling series
 Exon junction complex
 Eunoia Junior College, in Singapore